Education in South Australia is primarily the responsibility of the South Australian Government.

Early childhood education
Before starting school, children attend child care, or kindergarten (pre school). This is typically between the ages of three to five.

School education
Schooling in South Australia has historically had two tiers, primary school and high school (secondary school). Primary school ranges from reception to grade 7 (5 to 12 years old), from around 2020 moving to grade 6, and high school covers ages 13–18 (moving to 12–18). High school students in Australia are eligible to complete the South Australian Certificate of Education (SACE), with many private schools running International Baccalaureate programs.
 
Schools are run by the government (public schools), or by private concerns (private schools). Many private schools are run by churches. Public education is free, and while government funding is provided to private schools, parents must generally pay additional fees for their child's attendance at school.

In South Australia it is compulsory for children to be enrolled in school by their sixth birthday. All people under the age of 17 are required to participate in full-time schooling, training or work for at least 25 hours per week.  parents and guardians are responsible for the regular attendance of all children in their care between the ages of 6 and 16 years, under the Education and Children's Services Act 2019 (SA).

Tertiary education
Tertiary education is principally provided by the states three public universities, three private universities, and TAFE SA. The state's three main universities are the University of Adelaide, Flinders University, and the University of South Australia.

Public universities

The public universities also have other campuses in the metropolitan area, around the state, inter-state and overseas.

Metropolitan campuses include:
Flinders: Bedford Park; Victoria Square.
Adelaide: The Waite at Urrbrae; Research Park at Thebarton; and The National Wine Centre in the Adelaide Park Lands.
UniSA: Magill Campus (Magill) and Mawson Lakes Campus (Mawson Lakes).

Rural and regional campuses include:
Flinders: The Flinders University Rural Clinical Schools at Mount Gambier, Goolwa and Renmark; and The Lincoln Marine Science Centre at Port Lincoln.
Adelaide: Roseworthy Campus near Roseworthy.
UniSA: Campuses at Mount Gambier and Whyalla.

Interstate campuses include:
Flinders: The university maintains a number of external teaching partnerships in south-west Victoria and the Northern Territory.

Overseas campuses include:
Adelaide: Singapore Campus.

Private universities

Carnegie Mellon University's Heinz College Australia and ETC-Australia (Entertainment Technology Center – Australia Global Initiative) (sic – American spelling) both have campuses in Adelaide. The Heinz College, in Victoria Square, was established in 2006, and is the first American university to open a campus in Australia. ETC-Australia is located on Light Square.

CMU-Australia is co-located with the University College London's School of Energy and Resources (Australia), and world-class research and policy institutes, including Cranfield University (UK), partner the Torrens Resilience Institute and the Australian Centre for Social Innovation.

See also

 Australian Curriculum
 Education in Australia
 List of schools in South Australia

References

External links
 The Education System in South Australia sa.gov.au
 South Australian Certificate of Education